The LFG Roland C.VIII was a German reconnaissance aircraft of World War I. It was manufactured by Luft-Fahrzeug-Gesellschaft G.m.b.H.

The C.VIII was basically a C.III with a modified fuselage and a Mercedes D.IVa engine. Although the aircraft passed flight tests, the onset of Albatros C.X aircraft, license built by LFG Roland, meant that the C.VIII did not enter production.

Specifications

References

Further reading
 

Military aircraft of World War I
1910s German military reconnaissance aircraft
C.VIII
Single-engined tractor aircraft
Biplanes
Aircraft first flown in 1917